Cristina Guzmán is a 1943 Spanish drama film directed by Gonzalo Delgrás and starring Marta Santaolalla, Ismael Merlo and Luis García Ortega. It was made by CIFESA, Spain's dominant film studio of the era. The film is an adaptation of the 1936 novel Cristina Guzmán by Carmen de Icaza which was later remade in 1968.

Plot 
Cristina Guzmán (Marta Santaolalla), is a young widow with a young son in her care, who dedicates herself to giving language classes to support herself. One day she receives a visit from an aristocrat with a surprising proposal that will change her life: she must pretend to be Fifi, the wife of an American millionaire to try to get him to overcome the emotional trauma caused by the abandonment of his real wife.

Cast
 Marta Santaolalla as Cristina Guzmán  
 Ismael Merlo as Marqués de Atalanta  
 Luis García Ortega as Prince Valmore  
 Carlos Muñoz as Joe  
 Lily Vincenti as Gladys  
 Luis Martínez Tovar as Bubi  
 Jorge Greiner as Bert  
 Francisco Marimón as Rouvier  
 Fernando Fernán Gómez as Bob  
 Mary Vera as Georgette  
 Pedro Oltra as Alfaro  
 Horacio Socías as Fletcher  
 Mary Mirell as Ida  
 Montserrat Santaolalla as Pelirroja  
 Fernando Porredón as Gorito  
 Carmen Morando as Balbina 
 Francisco Zabala as Amigo del Marqués de Atalanta  
 Enriqueta Pezzi 
 Juana Mansó 
 Eva Arión 
 Carlota Bilbao 
 Conchita López
 Pablo Hidalgo 
 Cristina Yomar 
 María Martín
 Pedro Calderón

References

Bibliography 
 Bentley, Bernard. A Companion to Spanish Cinema. Boydell & Brewer, 2008.

External links 
 

1943 films
1943 drama films
Spanish drama films
1940s Spanish-language films
Films directed by Gonzalo Delgrás
Films based on Spanish novels
Cifesa films
Spanish black-and-white films
1940s Spanish films